María Jesús Montero Cuadrado (born 4 February 1966), is a Spanish hospital administrator and politician of the Spanish Socialist Workers' Party (PSOE) who has been serving as Minister of Finance and Civil Service under Prime Minister Pedro Sánchez since 2018.

Education and early career 
The daughter of teachers, Montero has a Degree in Medicine and Surgery from the University of Seville and master's degree in management from the EADA Business School in Barcelona.

At institutions like the Hospital Universitario Virgen del Rocío, Montero subsequently worked as a hospital administrator, holding various positions of responsibility throughout her career, mainly linked to the specialization of health management.

Political career 
Montero chaired the Committee on Marginalization of the Andalusia Youth Council between 1986 and 1988, and later, general secretary of the same until 1990.

Montero served as a Socialist deputy in the Parliament of Andalusia, representing the electoral constituency of Seville.

Regional Minister of Health in Andalusia, 2004–2013 
Between September 2002 and April 2004 Montero held the position of Deputy Minister of Health of the Junta de Andalucía, after which she was appointed head of the Regional Ministry of Health, a responsibility she held until May 2012, the date from which she assumed the Health portfolio and Social Welfare.

During Montero's tenure at the head of the Ministry of Health, new health rights were regulated, such as the second medical opinion, access to preimplantation genetic diagnosis, genetic counseling or dignified death. Also under her leadership, Andalusia defied a 2012 ban on free healthcare for undocumented immigrants, imposed by the central government as part of spending cuts to avoid an international bailout amid the European debt crisis.

In partnership with other institutions and the business sector, biomedical research has also been promoted, through a network of centers such as the Andalusian Center for Molecular Biology and Regenerative Medicine (CABIMER), the Institute of Biomedicine of Seville (IBIS), Center for genomics and oncology research (GENYO) or the Research Center for Innovative Medicines (MEDINA).

Regional Minister of Finance in Andalusia, 2013–2018 
From 9 September 2013 to 6 June 2018, Montero served as Minister of Finance and Public Administration of the Junta de Andalucía. At the head of this department, developed and approved five budgets without an absolute majority in Parliament, one with Izquierda Unida and four with Citizens. Andalusia is currently one of the few communities that complies with the rules of budgetary stability and financial sustainability (goal of deficit, debt and expenditure rule), in addition to becoming the common system community that previously pays its suppliers. Likewise, during these years important regulatory advances have been promoted in the Finance area, such as the decree of payment terms guarantees, with which the Junta de Andalucía self-imposed to reduce the maximum payment time in sectors to only 20 days. priority areas such as health, education and social services.

Minister of Finance, 2018–present 

Montero was chosen by prime minister Pedro Sánchez, following the motion of no confidence that the PSOE presented against the previous government of Mariano Rajoy (PP) and that was approved by the Congress of Deputies on 1 June 2018, to be Finance Minister in new Spanish cabinet. Felipe VI sanctioned by royal decree of June her appointment as holder of the portfolio of Minister of Treasury of Spain. On 7 June she took office as Minister before the King at Palace of Zarzuela.

By January 2019, Montero presented her minority government's first budget proposal of 472.7 billion euro ($543 billion), promising to reduce its deficit to 1.3 percent of gross domestic product but also increase social spending by over 6 percent; the proposal failed to get parliamentary approval and instead prompted a snap election.

In early 2020, after the November general election of 2019, Montero was confirmed by the Prime Minister to continue in the Finance portfolio. In addition, she was appointed as government spokeswoman.

Following recommendations from the International Monetary Fund (IMF) aimed at reviving the economy amid the COVID-19 pandemic in Spain, Montero led efforts in 2020 to suspend the constitutional commitment to any deficit targets for two years and allow the government to spend and borrow at will.

In 2021, Montero steered the government’s negotiations that resulted in the Chamber of Deputies approving a total central government budget of 196 billion euros – the biggest budget in the country's history –, after Prime Minister Sánchez had won the support of the Catalan pro-independence Republican Left of Catalonia. That year, she also reported that Spain's budget deficit had narrowed to 6.76% of gross domestic product from over 10% in 2020.

Political positions 
In a letter sent to their counterparts in the European Commission – Pierre Moscovici and Miguel Arias Cañete – in May 2019, Montero and Environment Minister Teresa Ribera called on the European Union to assess a potential carbon tax on power imports to protect the bloc’s interests and help it to pursue its environmental targets amid growing public concern over climate change.

References

External links

1966 births
21st-century Spanish women politicians
Finance ministers of Andalusia
Living people
Members of the 8th Parliament of Andalusia
Members of the 9th Parliament of Andalusia
Members of the 10th Parliament of Andalusia
Members of the 13th Congress of Deputies (Spain)
People from Seville
Economy and finance ministers of Spain
Spanish public health doctors
Spanish Socialist Workers' Party politicians
University of Seville alumni
Women government ministers of Spain
Female finance ministers
Women members of the Congress of Deputies (Spain)
Members of the 14th Congress of Deputies (Spain)
Women public health doctors